Fanny by Gaslight is a British drama television series, which originally aired on BBC1 between 24 September and 15 October 1981. It was an adaptation of the 1940 novel Fanny by Gaslight by Michael Sadleir, which had previously been adapted into a film Fanny by Gaslight in 1944. The series was adapted by Anthony Steven, directed by Peter Jefferies and produced by Joe Waters. Chloe Salaman plays the title role of Fanny Hooper, a young woman who is orphaned and faced with hardship in Victorian London.

Partial cast
 Chloe Salaman – Fanny Hooper
 Peter Woodward – Harry Somerford
 Michael Culver – Lord Manderstoke  
 Julia Chambers – Lucy Beckett

References

External links
 

1981 British television series debuts
1981 British television series endings
1980s British drama television series
BBC television dramas